Samuel Hugh Marron (7 February 1884 – 6 May 1954) was a former Australian rules footballer who played with Carlton in the Victorian Football League (VFL).

Notes

External links 

Sam Marron's profile at Blueseum

1884 births
1954 deaths
Australian rules footballers from Victoria (Australia)
Carlton Football Club players